Paddi Khalsa is a village in the tehsil of Phillaur, sub-tehsil of Goraya, Jalandhar district, in Punjab, India.

Demographics
According to the 2001 Census, Paddi Khalsa has a population of 1,455 people. The village has . Neighbouring villages include Virk, Jalandhar (also known as Birka), Indna Klaske, Meerapur, Kala, Paddi Jagir, Gohawar, Chachrari, Jamalpur,  Mouli and Chachoki.

History
It is said that the Soomal families living in the village originally settled from the neighbouring village of Mouli, which also has a number of families with the Soomal surname, also spelt Somal.

The village is famous for the Guru Nanak Mission Hospital . The charitable hospital offers local residence free medical services, and additionally holds an annual eye camp. The annual eye camp offers vision testing, and cataract eye removal surgery. As of 2017, the annual eye camp has included cancer screening services.  Gurdev

References

Jalandhar
Villages in Jalandhar district
Villages in Phillaur tehsil